Ambalavayal  is a village in Wayanad district in the state of Kerala, India. The Wayanad Heritage Museum is located in the village.

Demographics

As of the 2011 Census of India, Ambalavayal had a population of 16988 with 8290 males and 8698 females. The famous Edakkal Caves is in this Panchayat area at a distance of 6 km.

Tourism
Ambalavayal is a tourist place located in Wayanad district and is 10 km away from SulthanBathery. This location in Wayanad is situated above sea level and has a subtropical climate. This area is important for horticulture activities.

Heritage Museum
A special attraction for tourist at Ambalavayal Wayanad is Ambalavayal Heritage Museum. This is an archaeological museum and displays huge collections of vestige and antiques of 2nd Century AD. This is divided into four blocks named Gothrasmruthi, Devasmruthi, Jeevanasmruthi and Veerasmruthi. As the name indicates each block displays the related artefacts. These displays are of great interests to common people, archaeologists and historians. These displays include ancient hunting instruments like bows and arrows, stone weapons, clay sculptors and various other items like tribal pottery, rock engravings. Ambalavayal Heritage Museum is one of the best-maintained museums in Malabar region and is always an attraction for tourists. This museum will shed lights towards the history of Malabar area. This museum opens our eyes to the advanced civilization led by the tribes. Ambalavayal heritage museum provides a rare chance to view the items that are prepared by tribes getting inspired by nature and is used in their daily life. Visiting time to this museum is between 9 AM to 6 PM.

Regional Agricultural Research Station
Earlier this campus was a small Central Horticultural Research Station and later was upgraded to Regional Agricultural Research Station.
At Regional Agricultural Research Station, there grows a variety of crops like coffee, pepper, rice, spices like ginger, turmeric, clove, cinnamon, tropical and subtropical fruits, summer and cool season vegetables. This Research station at Ambalavayal is an ideal tourist place to gain more knowledge about variety of crops and its development and cultivation.

Tropical Gene Garden
The Tropical Gene Pool at Nadugani junction has 2424 acres area. 47,000 plants. second best of its kind in the world.  Museum of butterflies. Accommodation, food and trekking facility.

Villages and Suburbs
 Chulliyod
 Thekkankolly
 Nenmeni
 Malika

Transportation
Ambalavayal can be accessed from Mananthavady or Kalpetta. The Periya ghat road connects Mananthavady to Kannur and Thalassery.  The Thamarassery mountain road connects Calicut with Kalpetta. The Kuttiady mountain road connects Vatakara with Kalpetta and Mananthavady. The Palchuram mountain road connects Kannur and Iritty with Mananthavady.  The road from Nilambur to Ooty is also connected to Wayanad through the village of Meppadi.

The nearest railway station is at Mysore and the nearest airports are Kannur International Airport, 105 km, Kozhikode International Airport-120 km, and Bengaluru International Airport-290 km.

Image Gallery

References

Villages in Wayanad district
Sultan Bathery area